Cecil Stanley Denny (8 August 1908 – July 1991) was an English professional golfer.

His first British win was in the Malden Invitation Tournament in late 1937 where he beat Alf Padgham 5&4 in the 18-hole final. The tournament was contested by 16 invited players over two days. The following year he was one of the runners-up in the News Chronicle Tournament at East Brighton Golf Club, two shots behind Reg Whitcombe.

He was particularly successful in the Dutch Open, winning the event in 1948 and 1952 and being a runner-up three times before the war.

At the age of 46, Denny won the 1955 Spalding Tournament at Moor Park Golf Club by one stroke from Eric Lester, his first important win in Britain.

Tournament wins
1937 Malden Invitation Tournament
1948 Dutch Open
1952 Dutch Open
1955 Spalding Tournament

Results in major championships

Note: Denny only played in The Open Championship.

NT = No tournament
CUT = Missed the cut
"T" indicates a tie for a place

Team appearances
England–Scotland Professional Match (representing England): 1936 (winners)
Great Britain–Argentina Professional Match (representing Great Britain): 1939 (winners)

References

English male golfers
People from Great Finborough
1908 births
1991 deaths